Kekkonen's first cabinet was the 33rd government of Finland. The cabinet existed from 17 March 1950 to 17 January 1951. It was a minority government. The cabinet's Prime Minister was Urho Kekkonen.

During the cabinet's run, Kekkonen took a more significant role in the management of Soviet relations than president Paasikivi. For example, as Prime Minister, Kekkonen signed the Soviet-sponsored World Peace Council act banning atomic weapons. 
In June 1950, Kekkonen travelled to Moscow to agree on the first five-year agreement between Finnish-Soviet trade. The cabinet's foreign policy lead to an improvement in Finnish-Soviet relationships. 

One of the cabinet's problems was the large inflation caused by the Korean War.

Ministers 
 Key
  Resigned

References

 

Kekkonen, 1
1950 establishments in Finland
1951 disestablishments in Finland
Cabinets established in 1950
Cabinets disestablished in 1951
Cabinet 1